Donald Fraser may refer to:

 Donald Fraser (footballer), Scottish footballer who played for Sheffield United in 1889-90
 Donald Fraser (geologist) (born 1949), English geologist
 Donald Allan Fraser (1793–1843), Presbyterian minister in Nova Scotia and Newfoundland
 Donald B. Fraser (1868–1952), British religious minister and political activist
 Donald M. Fraser (1924–2019), U.S. congressman from Minnesota
 Donald M. Fraser (British politician) (born 1904), British politician, chair of the Common Wealth Party
 Don Fraser (figure skater) (born 1955), Canadian pair skater
 Don Fraser Sr. (1901–1978), Australian rules footballer for Oakleigh and Richmond
 Don Fraser Jr. (1922–1987), Australian rules footballer for Richmond, Port Melbourne and Prahran
 Don Fraser (footballer, born 1882) (1882–1963), Australian rules footballer for Collingwood
 Donald Fraser (Ohio politician) (1927–2010), member of the Ohio House of Representatives
 Donald Hamilton Fraser (1929–2009), painter
 Donald A. S. Fraser (1925–2020), Canadian statistician
 Donald J. Fraser (1908–1982), politician in Nova Scotia
 Donald F. Fraser (1872–1946), Canadian politician
 Donald Fraser (missionary) (1870–1933), Scottish missionary in Africa